Fourche a Renault is a stream in Washington County in the U.S. state of Missouri. It is a tributary of Mineral Fork.

The stream emerges from the confluence of the Middle Fork Fourche a Renault and North Fork Fourche a Renault

Fourche a Renault has the name of Philip Francois Renault, a pioneer citizen.

See also
Fourche a Renault, Missouri
List of rivers of Missouri

References

Rivers of Washington County, Missouri
Rivers of Missouri